Nicholas Frankl OLY (born 26 July 1971) is a London-born, Monaco-based serial entrepreneur, automotive journalist, and former Hungarian bobsledder. He piloted HUN1 in the two-man in the 1994 Winter Olympics in Lillehammer, Norway, and in the four-man in the 1998 Nagano, Japan and 2002 Salt Lake City, USA games, respectively. 

He is the founder of several businesses including My Yacht Group a luxury events company centered around charity-focused receptions on board Superyachts; and Entertainment MarketPlace, a sponsorship and marketing company.

Personal life
Frankl is the son of Margaret "June" Frankl (3 March 1941 – 28 February 2017) and Andrew Frankl, a refugee of the Hungarian revolution who fled to London in 1956, and went on to become an automotive television, radio and print journalist specializing in Formula One.

Television and radio
Frankl has been featured in several programs including "Million Pound Mega Yachts", centered around the annual Monaco Yacht Show, "How'd You Get So Rich (UK)", hosted by comedienne Katherine Ryan, and "Georgey Tonight", a BBC Radio show presented by Georgey Spanswick. He has been featured in the New York Times in an article about the Bullrun Rally and its participants, and in Austin American Statesman discussing the United States Grand Prix in Austin, Texas.

References

External links
 

1971 births
Living people
Hungarian male bobsledders
Olympic bobsledders of Hungary
Bobsledders at the 1994 Winter Olympics
Bobsledders at the 1998 Winter Olympics
Bobsledders at the 2002 Winter Olympics
Sportspeople from London